Rinorea cordata is a species of plant in the Violaceae family. It is endemic to Colombia.

References

cordata
Endangered plants
Endemic flora of Colombia
Taxonomy articles created by Polbot